KDDK (105.5 FM) is an American commercial radio station broadcasting a Spanish Hits format. Licensed to Addis, Louisiana, the station serves the Baton Rouge area.  As of January 2009, the station is owned by Radio & Investments, Inc.

Music Programming includes Regional Mexican, Salsa, Latin Pop, Reggaeton, Bachata, and Latin Oldies.

History
The station went on the air as KFRA-FM in Franklin, Louisiana.  On 1985-02-06, the station changed its call sign to KFMV, on 2004-09-28 to the current KDDK.  On 2008-04 the station changed its format from variety to Spanish and became the frequency in Baton Rouge for a Spanish radio station located in New Orleans LA. The station moved from Franklin, Louisiana to its current location in Addis, Louisiana in 2007 after being granted permission to do so by the FCC in 2006.

References

External links

Radio stations in Louisiana
Spanish-language radio stations in Louisiana
2004 establishments in Louisiana